The Queen's Own Hussars (QOH), was a cavalry regiment of the British Army, formed from the amalgamation of the 3rd The King's Own Hussars and the 7th Queen's Own Hussars at Candahar Barracks, Tidworth in 1958. The regiment served in Aden and Northern Ireland and as part of the British Army of the Rhine. The regiment was amalgamated with the Queen's Royal Irish Hussars to form the Queen's Royal Hussars on 1 September 1993.

History
The regiment was formed from the amalgamation of the 3rd The King's Own Hussars and the 7th Queen's Own Hussars at Candahar Barracks, Tidworth in November 1958. The regiment remained at Tidworth as an armoured regiment within 3rd Armoured Division. One squadron was sent to Warminster as Demonstration Squadron to School of Infantry in March 1959 and another was sent to Aden in February 1960. The regiment was re-deployed to York Barracks in Munster as an armoured regiment within 6th Infantry Brigade in July 1960 and then was sent to Hobart Barracks in Detmold as an armoured regiment in 20th Armoured Brigade Group in August 1962.

The regiment was re-roled as a training regiment based at Cambrai Barracks at Catterick Garrison in February 1965, except for one squadron which was deployed as Berlin Armoured Squadron in West Germany. In February 1967 the regiment moved to Maresfield from where squadrons were deployed to Aden in July 1967, to Sharjah in July 1967, to Singapore in October 1968 and to Cyprus in June 1969. It was re-roled again as an armoured regiment in 7th Armoured Brigade based at Caen Barracks in Hohne in August 1970: from there squadrons were deployed to Northern Ireland at the height of the Troubles. It moved to Bovington Camp as the RAC Centre regiment in August 1974 and to Hobart Barracks in Detmold as an armoured regiment in 20 Armoured Brigade in May 1976 from where further tours in Northern Ireland were conducted. The regiment returned to Cambrai Barracks at Catterick as RAC Training Regiment in April 1983 and then re-roled as armoured regiment for 22nd Armoured Brigade at Caen Barracks in Hohne in January 1985. From there squadrons were deployed to Cyprus for duty as an armoured reconnaissance unit and to Northern Ireland for duty as the Maze prison guard force.

The regiment was amalgamated with the Queen's Royal Irish Hussars to form the Queen's Royal Hussars on 1 September 1993.

Regimental museum
The Queen's Own Hussars Museum was based at Lord Leycester Hospital in Warwick until 2016. The regimental collection is moving to a new facility in Warwick known as "Trinity Mews": it is due to open in 2018.

Colonels of the regiment
Colonels of the regiment were as follows:
1958–1962: Major-General Ralph Younger CB CBE DSO MC DL JP
1926–1965: Colonel Sir Douglas Scott, Bt
1965–1969: Brigadier David Hugh Davies MC
1969–1975: Lieutenant-General Sir Patrick Howard-Dobson GCB ADC Gen
1975–1981: Colonel Marcus Fox MC
1981–1987: Lieutenant-General Sir Robin Carnegie KCB OBE
1987–1993: Brigadier James Rucker

Commanding Officers 
Commanding Officers:

 1958–1961: Lieutenant Colonel David H. Davies
 1961–1963: Lt Col Marcus Fox
 1963–1965: Lt Col Patrick John Howard-Dobson
 1965–1967: Lt Col A. Michael L. Hogge
 1967–1969: Lt Col Robin MacDonald Carnegie
 1969–1971: Lt Col Michael B. Pritchard
 1971–1974: Lt Col John B. Venner
 1974–1976: Lt Col James W. F. Rucker
 1976–1979: Lt Col Robin D. H. H. Greenwood
 1979–1982: Lt Col Hugh Michael Sandars
 1982–1984: Lt Col Jeremy Julian Joseph Phipps
 1984–1987: Lt Col David John Malcolm Jenkins
 1987–1989: Lt Col Richard S. Fox
 1989–1992: Lt Col Charles W. M. Carter
 1992–1993: Lt Col Michael R. Bromley-Gardner

Alliances
The regiment's alliances were as follows:
  87th Field Battery Royal Canadian Artillery
  7th/XI Hussars
  19th Alberta Dragoons
  Sherbrooke Hussars
  3rd/9th Light Horse (South Australian Mounted Rifles)
  Waikato Regiment
  Wellington East Coast Regiment
  Queen Alexandra's Mounted Rifles
  Umvoti Mounter Rifles

See also 
The Queen's Own Hussars Museum

References

External links 
Museum Homepage

Cavalry regiments of the British Army
Hussar regiments of the British Army
Military units and formations established in 1958
1958 establishments in the United Kingdom
Component units of the Queen's Royal Hussars